John Waryn was Archdeacon of Barnstaple from 1429 to 1442.

References

Archdeacons of Barnstaple
15th-century English people